Henry Alexander Munro-Butler-Johnstone (7 December 1837 – 17 October 1902) was a British author and Conservative Party politician.

Born as Henry Alexander Butler-Johnstone, he was the son of Henry Butler-Johnstone (himself born Hon. Henry Butler), a younger son of the 13th Baron Dunboyne, by his wife Isabella Margaret Munro, daughter of Sir Alexander Munro. His father took the surname Butler-Johnstone to honour an inheritance from his wife's uncle, and he himself took the additional surname Munro from his mother in 1874.

He was educated at Eton and at Christ Church, Oxford, graduating in 1861 with a first-class Bachelor of Arts degree in classics. In 1862 he was elected Member of Parliament for Canterbury, a position he resigned in 1878. From 1868 he sat as an independent. He was also Deputy Lieutenant for Ross-shire, and in 1875 published the book The Eastern Question.

He died in Paris on 17 October 1902. In 1909 his body was cremated and his ashes transferred to England, where he was buried.

Family
Munro-Butler-Johnstone married in 1877 Maria Irina Gabriella, Countess de Soyres, who died in 1880. He remarried in December 1896 Mrs. Skipp Lloyd, widow of Joseph Skipp Lloyd, formerly Clerk of the Cheque and Adjutant of the Honourable Corps of Gentlemen at Arms.

References

External links 
 
 
 

1837 births
1902 deaths
Conservative Party (UK) MPs for English constituencies
UK MPs 1859–1865
UK MPs 1865–1868
UK MPs 1868–1874
UK MPs 1874–1880
Deputy Lieutenants of Ross-shire
People educated at Eton College
Alumni of Christ Church, Oxford
Politics of Canterbury